Robert Neilson Brown (19 August 1870 – 17 August 1943), sometimes misidentified as J. Brown, was a Scottish footballer whose career included periods at Sheffield Wednesday and Bolton Wanderers.

Club career
Brown was born in Port Eglinton in the south of Glasgow, but moved with his family to Halfway, a district of Cambuslang, during his childhood. He began his senior career as an at local club Cambuslang F.C. who were founder members of the Scottish Football League in 1890. He signed for The Wednesday before the club gained admission to the English Football League in 1892, making a name for himself when scoring in a 4–1 defeat of League side Bolton Wanderers in the FA Cup shortly after arriving in January of that year. He went on to make 45 appearances in Wednesday's first two League seasons and, after a brief spell back in his native Scotland with Third Lanark, he then joined Bolton Wanderers in 1895, moving to a more defensive role and latterly operating as a capable reserve in almost any outfield position as needed; he made 149 appearances at Burnden Park, 94 of them in the top flight. Brown also briefly had a loan spell at Burnley in 1897, making four appearances but was unable to save them from relegation. He retired in 1902 and settled in Lancashire.

International career
While a teenager at Cambuslang, Brown was selected once for the Scotland national team against Wales in 1890. The following year he played for the Glasgow FA in their annual challenge match against Sheffield, and after moving to that city he featured in a 'Midlands v North' representative fixture.

References

Sources

Scottish footballers
Scotland international footballers
Footballers from Glasgow
Sportspeople from Cambuslang
Sheffield Wednesday F.C. players
Bolton Wanderers F.C. players
Burnley F.C. players
1870 births
1943 deaths
Third Lanark A.C. players
Association football inside forwards
Association football central defenders
Cambuslang F.C. players
Scottish Football League players
Football Alliance players
English Football League players
Footballers from South Lanarkshire